Christoff De Bolle (born in Ninove, Belgium on 18 June 1976), better known by the mononym Christoff is a Belgian Flemish schlager singer. He is also a radio presenter, and appeared in a number of television series. Since 2015, he has been part of the schlager boyband Klubbb3, together with Florian Silbereisen and Jan Smit.

Awards
2010: Career Award for 20 years in music
2011, 2013, 2016: Music Industry Awards (MIA), Best Flemish language Artist
2012, 2013: Anne Vlaamse Muziek Award for Best Male Schlager Artist
2013, 2014: Radio 2 Zomerhit for "Best Male Artist"
2015: Radio 2 Zomerhit for "Best Ambiance"

Discography

Albums

Compilation albums

Singles

*Those indicated as Ultratip did not appear in the official Belgian Ultratop 50 charts, but rather in the bubbling under Ultratip charts.

References

External links
Official website

1976 births
Living people
People from Ninove
21st-century Belgian male singers
21st-century Belgian singers